is a passenger railway station  located in the city of  Nishinomiya Hyōgo Prefecture, Japan. It is operated by the private transportation company Hanshin Electric Railway.

Lines

Layout
The station consists of two opposed elevated  side platforms. There is only one ticket gate on the 1st floor, and the platforms are on the 2nd floor. The station building and platform have been decorated in a retro style reminiscent of the Meiji period, taking into consideration the voices of local residents who wanted the original station building to be preserved. The platform straddles the Shukugawa River.

Platforms

Gallery

History 
Kōroen Station opened on 12 April 1905 along with the rest of the Hanshin Main Line.

On 17 January 1995, the station was damaged by the Great Hanshin earthquake. Service in the affected area was restored by 26 June 1995.

Station numbering was introduced on 21 December 2013, with Kōroen being designated as station number HS-18.

Passenger statistics
In fiscal 2019, the station was used by an average of 5,764 passengers daily

Surrounding area
Shukugawa Park
Nishinomiya City Otani Memorial Art Museum
Nishinomiya City Education and Cultural Center

See also
List of railway stations in Japan

References

External links

 Kōroen Station website 

Railway stations in Japan opened in 1907
Railway stations in Hyōgo Prefecture
Hanshin Main Line
Nishinomiya